The Elfin Mallala was a sports racing car produced in 1962 and 1963 by Garrie Cooper's Elfin Sports Cars.  It had a small run of only five cars.  Its first race was at the Mallala Race Circuit which gave its name to the car.  It has the historical distinction of being the first Australian built racing car to race in England.

Cars

Technical specifications and features

Drivetrain
mid mounted 4 cylinder, 1600 cc engine
From 
5 speed gearbox

Suspension
Front: Tubular wishbones, coil/shock absorbers,  non-adjustable anti-roll bar
Rear: Reversed lower wishbones, driveshaft top link, trailing radius arms
Exceptions were:
chassis 6318: tubular top link, splined driveshaft
chassis 6316: tubular top link, drive shafts with rubber doughnuts

Brakes
Front:  discs
Rear:  drums
The last three cars had discs on all four wheels.

Wheels/Tyres
13" wheels

Construction
Aluminium body panels, fiberglass nose and tail.  (The first car aluminium nose and tail).
Space frame chassis

Dimensions
Length 
Front Track  	
Rear Track 
Wheelbase 
Kerb Weight

See also
 Mallala (disambiguation)

References

External links
Official Site
Concept Carz

Mallala
Sports racing cars
Cars of Australia